The Municipal Corporations Act (Ireland) 1840 (3 & 4 Vict. c. 108), An Act for the Regulation of Municipal Corporations in Ireland, was passed by the Parliament of the United Kingdom on 10 August 1840. It was one of the Municipal Corporations (Ireland) Acts 1840 to 1888.

The Act followed similar lines to the Municipal Corporations Act 1835 which reformed municipal boroughs in England and Wales. Prior to the passing of the Act, there were 68 borough corporations in Ireland. However, many of them were ineffective, some were virtually defunct and none of them in any way representative of their populations. The Act dissolved all but 10 of the corporations.

The Reformed corporations 

The ten reformed corporations, which were named in Schedule A to the Act were to be styled as Mayor, Aldermen and Burgesses, with the exception of Dublin where the title Right Honourable Lord Mayor was retained.

Dissolved boroughs 
Under section 13 of the Act, the remaining 58 borough corporations were dissolved on 25 October 1840. The extinguished boroughs were listed in schedules B and I of the Act. Boroughs in schedule B could petition for a grant of a charter restoring borough status, as could any town with a population of more than 3,000. Boroughs in Schedule I were already effectively extinct at the time of the passing of the Act, and so were not permitted to apply for such a charter.

Wexford's application for restoration of its charter was granted in 1846. Cashel also applied, but without success.

Boroughs in Schedule B

Boroughs in Schedule I

Town commissioners 

Many of the extinguished boroughs had an additional form of local government in place, in the form of commissioners appointed under the Lighting of Towns (Ireland) Act 1828. Where such a body existed, it was deemed to be the successor to the corporation. Section 16 of the Act provided that any borough dissolved with property worth more than £100, and which did not have commissioners under the 1828 Act, should have a board of municipal commissioners established. In most cases, the commissioners appointed under the terms of the 1840 Act eventually adopted the terms of the 1828 Act or its replacement, the Towns Improvement (Ireland) Act 1854. By 1876, only Carrickfergus was still governed by commissioners appointed under the 1840 Act.

References

Sources
Primary
 
 Bills: 1835 HC;  1836 HC, HL, HC amend Lords; 1837 HC, recommit; 1837–8 HC, recommit, 2nd recommit, O'Connell amendments; 1838 HC, HL, HL and HC and HL; 1839 HC, commit, 2nd recommit, HL; 1840 HC recommit, HL.
 Municipal Corporations Commissioners (HC 1835 xxvii–xxviii and HC 1836 xxiv [23–29] ): Report, Supplement, Appendix: circuits reporting on towns  Pt 1: S, Mid, W, SE, and pt NE, Pt 2: end NE and pt NW, Pt 3: end NW; Dublin Contents, pt 1 pp.1–116, pt 2 pp.117–2 
 Municipal Boundaries Commissioners (HC 1837 xxix [301] 1) Report, Maps
{|class="wikitable"
|+Hansard debates on Municipal Corporations (Ireland) Bills, 1835–1840
!rowspan=2| Session !!colspan=3| Commons !! colspan=3| Lords !!colspan=3| Other house's amendments 
|-
! (1st &) 2nd r !! Ctee !! 3rd r !! 2nd r !! Ctee (& Rpt) !! 3rd r !! L in C !! C in L !! 2nd L in C
|-
| 1835
| 1st r: Jul 312nd r: Aug 10 12
| Aug 13
| Aug 17
|-
|1836
| Feb 29 
| Mar 7 8 14 18 21 22 23 
| Mar 28 
| Apr 18 
| Apr 26, May 9 16
| May 18 
| May 19, Jun 10 13
| Jun 17 27  
| Jun 30
|-
|1837
| 1st r: Feb 7 82nd r: Feb 17
| Feb 20 21 22, Mar 20 
| Apr 10 11
| Apr 13 25 
| May 5 Jun 9
|-
|1837–38
| 1st r: Dec 5 112nd r: Feb 2 
| May 29, Jun 1 11 15 18
| Jun 25
| Jul 9
| Jul 12 
| Jul 27 
| Aug 2
| Aug 4 
| Aug 9
|-
|1839
| 1st r: Feb 142nd r: Mar 1 8 22 
| Jun 28 Jul 4
| Jul 15 
| Jul 22
| Jul 25
| Aug 5
| Aug 12
|-
|1840
| Feb 14 
| Feb 24 28, Mar 3 
| Mar 9
| Mar 23, May 4
| May 14 15, Jun 12 19 29, Jul 6Rpt: Jul 10
| Jul 20 31
| Aug 3
| Aug 5 6
| Aug 7
|}

Secondary
 Mark Callanan & Justin F Keogan (editors), Local Government in Ireland Inside Out, Dublin, 2003
 Desmond Roche, Local Government in Ireland, Dublin, 1982

Citations

United Kingdom Acts of Parliament 1840
Acts of the Parliament of the United Kingdom concerning Ireland
History of local government in the United Kingdom
History of local government in Ireland
1840 in Ireland
Boroughs of Ireland
Local government legislation
Electoral reform in Ireland (1801–1921)
Repealed United Kingdom Acts of Parliament
1972 endings
2001 endings